New Voices is the only American national magazine written for and by Jewish college students. Published since 1991 by the independent, non-profit, student-run Jewish Student Press Service, New Voices is read by over 20,000 students across the United States and abroad. 

The magazine is produced by one recent college graduate in New York City and dozens of student writers from campuses across the country on a shoestring annual budget.

History 

The Jewish Student Press Service was established in 1971 to provide quality, student-written articles to a then-thriving national network of local Jewish campus publications across the United States. Many of today's most accomplished Jewish journalists got their start at the Jewish Student Press Service. Current and former writers and editors of The New York Times, The Washington Post, The New York Jewish Week, The New Jersey Jewish News, Dissent, The Jewish Telegraphic Agency, Lilith, and Sh'ma are all past contributors to the Jewish Student Press Service.

In 1991, faced with a decline in the number of individual campus publications, the Jewish Student Press Service changed its focus and began publishing its own magazine, called New Voices, which now operates online as a fully digital magazine. As an independent publication and educational organization, each Editor is recently-graduated and hired for an average two-year contract. New Voices Magazine is supported by the Jewish Student Press Service Board of Directors, an intergenerational board composed largely of previous Press Service editors and writers.

Sections 

Campus & Community
The Conspiracy Blog 
Opinion
Arts and Culture
New Vices
Torah With Attitude

News coverage 

In a 2007 article in The Nation, Eyal Press writes about New Voice'''s budget crisis:

“In the end, Solelim announced a new arrangement: New Voices'' was given a $10,000 grant instead of the $30,000 it had expected, and was required to offer $9,000 in free advertising to two hard-line pro-Israel groups, Stand With Us and the David Project. This scuttled New Voices's capacity-building plans, and one staffer had to be let go.”

External links 
New Voices' official website
Records of the Jewish Student Press Service at the American Jewish Historical Society, New York, NY and Boston, MA

References 

Student magazines published in the United States
Jewish magazines published in the United States
Magazines established in 1991
1991 establishments in the United States
Online magazines published in the United States
Magazines published in New York City